Ayub Afridi may refer to:
 Ayub Afridi (politician), Pakistani senator
 Ayub Afridi (drug lord), Pakistani drug lord